The first season of the British-American animated comedy children's television series The Amazing World of Gumball originally aired from May 3, 2011, to March 13, 2012, on Cartoon Network, and was produced by Cartoon Network Development Studio Europe. Consisting of 36 episodes, the season premiered with the episode "The DVD" and concluded with the episode "The Fight". The season premiere was watched by 2.120 million viewers in the United States.

Development

Plot 
The season focuses on the misadventures of Gumball Watterson, a blue 12-year-old cat, along with his adopted brother, Darwin, a 10-year-old goldfish. Together, they cause mischief among their family, as well as with the wide array of students at Elmore Junior High, where they attend middle school. In a behind-the-scenes video documenting the production of the second season, creator Ben Bocquelet expanded on the development of some of the characters, and how they are based on interactions from his childhood.

Production 
The first season began filming on November 2, 2010, and ended filming on September 13, 2011. The first season premiered in the US on May 3, 2011, with the episode "The DVD" and ended March 12, 2012, with the episode "The Fight" almost a year later. The world premiere of the show was on May 11, 2011, on Cartoon Network UK with the episode "The Mystery".

Episodes for this season were written by Bocquelet, Jon Foster, James Lamont, Andrew Brenner, Mic Graves, Sam Ward, David Cadji-Newby, and Tommy Panays, and storyboarded by Ben Marsaud, Celine Gobinet, George Gendi, Dave Smith, Philip Warner, Chuck Klein, Chris Garbutt, Aurelie Charbonnier, Amandine Pécharman, Rob Latimer, Kent Osborne, Darren Vandenburg, Jacques Gauthier, Dave Needham, Tom Parkison, and Michael Gendi. Two episodes, entitled "The Mom" and "The Pizza", were written for this season, but never produced. However, the concept of the former was reused in the show's third season's episode "The Mothers"; and the concept of the latter was reused in the show's second season's episode "The Job" but then, it became an episode of the show's third season with the same name "The Pizza" and the second was later produced (but with some changes) in the show's third season. Two episodes more never produced like the aforementioned, but their plots and titles are still unknown.

Reception

Ratings
The season premiere "The DVD" was watched by 2.120 million viewers in the United States, and received a 0.4 rating in the 18–49 demographic Nielsen household rating. Nielsen ratings are audience measurement systems that determine the audience size and composition of television programming in the United States, which means that the episode was seen by 0.8 percent of all 18- to 49-year-olds at the time of the broadcast. This season had an average of 2.00 million viewers per episode in the United States. "The DVD", the first episode of the season, was broadcast on a Tuesday night at 8:30 pm. All episodes of the season from "The Responsible" to "The Club" were broadcast on Monday nights at 7:30 pm. All remaining episodes of the season, starting with "The Wand", were broadcast on Tuesday nights at 7:30 pm.

Critical reception
The A.V. Clubs Noel Murray graded the DVD release of the series' first 12 episodes a B+, writing that "what sets [The Amazing World of Gumball] apart from the many other super-silly, semi-anarchic cartoons on cable these days is that it features such a well-developed world, where even with the eclectic character designs, there are recognizable traits and tendencies." "Z." of GeekDad gave the first volume DVD a positive review; he praised the season for having "genuine heart even as the plots themselves transition from well-worn TV tropes to all out madness." He panned the lack of extra features on the disc, but said "[the disc] at least gives viewers the opportunity to experience the show's delightful theme song, ... often truncated during television broadcasts".

Tyler Foster of DVD Talk gave the first season a lukewarm review. In reviewing the first DVD volume, he praised the "knockout" visuals but felt the animation was "relatively simple, even when it's going exaggerated for a gag." He was weary of the morals presented in the premiere, and found the comedy throughout the volume "anemic". He criticized the lack of extra features on the disk, saying the single character gallery "was so anemic I can't even give it half a star." DVD Verdict reviewer Paul Pritchard gave the first volume 88 out of 100. He praised the season for its visuals, which he felt complemented the series' "anarchic nature". He stated that while the moral lessons aimed toward family audiences, he stated that, "in something of a twist, such lessons are completely lost on Gumball and his pals—something I personally took great delight in." However, he wrote that the lack of a selection extras was "pretty poor." Mac McEntire of the same website also applauded the season's visuals but stated "laughs are hit or miss", and that the randomness of the humor was "its biggest detriment"; he gave the second volume 75 out of 100. Nancy Basile of About.com favored "The Ghost" out of the third DVD volume; she praised the series as a "smart, fast-paced, hilarious cartoon."

Episodes

DVD releases

References

2011 American television seasons
2011 British television seasons
2012 American television seasons
2012 British television seasons
1